The NFC Championship Game is the annual championship game of the National Football Conference (NFC) and one of the two semifinal playoff games of the National Football League (NFL), the largest professional American football league in the world. The game is played on the last Sunday in January by the two remaining playoff teams, following the NFC postseason's first two rounds. The NFC champion then advances to face the winner of the AFC Championship Game in the Super Bowl.

The game was established as part of the 1970 merger between the NFL and the American Football League (AFL), with the merged league realigning into two conferences. Since 1984, each winner of the NFC Championship Game has also received the George Halas Trophy, named after the founder and longtime owner of the Chicago Bears, George Halas.

History
The first NFC Championship Game was played following the 1970 regular season after the merger between the NFL and the American Football League. The game is considered the successor to the original NFL Championship, and its game results are listed with that of its predecessor in the annual NFL Record and Fact Book. Since the pre-merger NFL consisted of six more teams than the AFL (16 teams for the NFL and 10 for the AFL), a realignment was done as part of the merger to create two conferences with an equal number of teams: The NFL's Baltimore Colts, the Cleveland Browns, and the Pittsburgh Steelers joined the ten former AFL teams to form the AFC; while the remaining 13 pre-merger NFL clubs formed the NFC.

Every NFC team has played in an NFC Championship at least once. The Seattle Seahawks, who have been members in both the AFC and the NFC, hold the distinction of appearing in both conference title games. Only the Detroit Lions have yet to win or host an NFC Championship Game. The San Francisco 49ers have the most appearances in the NFC Championship Game at 18, and have hosted the most at 10. The Dallas Cowboys have won the most NFC Championships at 8.

The Los Angeles Rams and the Minnesota Vikings are the only two NFC teams to appear in at least one NFC Championship game in every decade since 1970.

Playoff structure

The structure of the NFL playoffs has changed several times since 1970. At the end of each regular season, the top teams in the NFC qualify for the postseason, including all division champions (three division winners from the 1970–71 to 2001–02 seasons; four since the 2002–03 season) and a set number of "wild card" teams that possess the two best win–loss records after the regular season yet fail to win their division (one wild card team from the 1970–71 to 1977–78 seasons; two wild cards from 1978–79 to 1989–90, and from 2002–03 to 2019–20; three from 1990–91 to 2001–02, and since 2020–21). The two teams remaining following the Wild Card round (first round) and the divisional round (second round) play in the NFC Championship Game, with the winner advancing to the Super Bowl.

Initially, the site of the NFC Championship Game was determined on a rotating basis. Since the 1975–76 season, the site of the game has been based on playoff seeding based on the regular season won-loss record, with the highest surviving seed hosting the game. A wild card team can only host the game if both participants are wild cards; such an instance has yet to occur in the NFL.

George Halas Trophy

Beginning with the 1984–85 NFL playoffs, the winner of the NFC Championship Game has received the George Halas Trophy, named after the longtime owner and coach of the Chicago Bears, a charter member of the NFL. The original design consisted of a wooden base with a sculpted NFC logo in the front and a sculpture of various football players in the back.

It, and the Lamar Hunt Trophy that is awarded to the AFC champion, were redesigned for the 2010–11 NFL playoffs by Tiffany & Co. at the request of the NFL in an attempt to make both awards more significant. The trophies are now a new, silver design with the outline of a hollow football positioned on a small base to more closely resemble the Vince Lombardi Trophy, awarded to the winner of the Super Bowl.

The George Halas Trophy should not be confused with the Newspaper Enterprise Association's George Halas Trophy, which was awarded to the NFL's defensive player of the year from 1966 to 1996 or the Pro Football Writers Association's George S. Halas Courage Award.

Prior to the merger in 1970, the NFL champions were awarded the Ed Thorp Memorial Trophy, starting in 1934.

List of NFC Championship Games
Numbers in parentheses in the winning team column are NFC Championships won by that team. Bold indicates team won Super Bowl that year.
Numbers in parentheses in the city and stadium column is the number of times that metropolitan area and stadium has hosted a NFC Championship, respectively.

Appearances, 1970–present

Appearances by year
In the sortable table below, teams are ordered first by number of appearances, then by number of wins, and finally by year of first appearance. In the "Season(s)" column, bold years indicate winning Conference Championship appearances.

Records by division

The table below shows NFC Championship Game records by division, based on the division the franchise was in during the season the championship game was played. The NFL realigned divisions prior to the 2002 season, renaming the NFC Central as the NFC North, creating the NFC South, and shifting several teams among the divisions.

Most common matchups

NFC Championship Game records

 Most victories: 8 – Dallas Cowboys (1970–1971, 1975, 1977–1978, 1992–1993, 1995)
 Most losses: 11** – San Francisco 49ers (1970–1971, 1983, 1990, 1992–1993, 1997, 2011, 2013, 2021–2022)
 Most appearances: 18 – San Francisco 49ers (1970–1971, 1981, 1983–1984, 1988–1990, 1992–1994, 1997, 2011–2013, 2019, 2021–2022)
 Most consecutive appearances: 4 (tie, 2 teams, 3 times)
 Dallas Cowboys (1970–1973, 1992–1995)
 Philadelphia Eagles (2001–2004) 
 Most consecutive victories: 2 – (tie, 6 teams, 8 times)
 Dallas Cowboys (1970–1971, 1977–1978, 1992–1993)
 Minnesota Vikings (1973–1974)
 Washington Redskins (1982–1983)
 San Francisco 49ers (1988–1989)
 Green Bay Packers (1996–1997)
 Seattle Seahawks (2013–2014)
 Most victories without a loss: 5** – New York Giants (1986, 1990, 2000, 2007, 2011)
 Most appearances without a win: 1 – Detroit Lions (1991)
 Most consecutive appearances without a win: 6 – Minnesota Vikings (1977, 1987, 1998, 2000, 2009, 2017)
 Most defensive shutouts: 2**; – New York Giants (Jan 11, 1987, 17–0 vs Redskins and Jan 14, 2001, 41–0 vs Vikings) 
 Most times shut out: 2**; – Los Angeles Rams (Jan 7, 1979, 0–28 vs Cowboys and Jan 12, 1986, 0–24 vs Bears) 
 Most consecutive losses: 3* – (tie, 3 times)
 Los Angeles Rams (1974–1976)
 Dallas Cowboys (1980–1982)
 Philadelphia Eagles (2001–2003)
 Most games hosted: 10 – San Francisco 49ers (1970, 1981, 1984, 1989–1990, 1992, 1994, 1997, 2011, 2019)
 Most consecutive games hosted: 3; – Philadelphia Eagles (2002–2004) 
 Most numerous matchup: 6** – Dallas Cowboys vs. San Francisco 49ers (1970–1971, 1981, 1992–1994)
 Most points scored: 49 points – January 24, 2016 – Carolina Panthers vs. Arizona Cardinals (2015)
 Largest margin of victory: 41 points – January 14, 2001 (2000), New York Giants (41) vs. Minnesota Vikings (0)
 Closest margin of victory: 1 point – San Francisco 49ers (28) vs. Dallas Cowboys (27), 1981 NFC Championship Game**
 Fewest points scored, winning team: 9; January 6, 1980 (1979) – Los Angeles Rams vs. Tampa Bay Buccaneers
 Fewest points scored, either team: 0*; (tie, 5 teams, 6 times)
 Los Angeles Rams 0 vs Dallas Cowboys 28 January 7, 1979
 Tampa Bay Buccaneers 0 vs Los Angeles Rams 9 January 6, 1980
 Chicago Bears 0 vs San Francisco 49ers 23 January 6, 1985
 Los Angeles Rams 0 vs Chicago Bears 24 January 12, 1986
 Washington Redskins 0 vs New York Giants 17 January 11, 1987
 Minnesota Vikings 0 vs New York Giants 41 January 14, 2001
 Most points scored, losing team: 28 (tie); January 15, 1995 (1994) – Dallas Cowboys vs. San Francisco 49ers, January 24, 2010 (2009) – Minnesota Vikings at New Orleans Saints
 Most combined points scored: 66; January 15, 1995 (1994) – San Francisco 49ers (38) vs. Dallas Cowboys (28)
 Fewest combined points scored: 9**; January 6, 1980 (1979) – Los Angeles Rams (9) vs. Tampa Bay Buccaneers (0)
 Longest game: 71 minutes, 52 seconds**; January 17, 1999 (1998) – Atlanta Falcons (30) @ Minnesota Vikings (27), OT
 Most NFC Championships won in overtime: 2** – New York Giants (2007, 2011)
 Most NFC Championships lost in overtime: 2* (tie) – Green Bay Packers (2007, 2014) Minnesota Vikings (1998, 2009)
 Current teams which have never hosted an NFC Championship Game:
 Detroit Lions
 Current teams which have never won an NFC Championship:
 Detroit Lions (0–1)
 Longest drought without appearing in an NFC Championship Game: 29 years
 Detroit Lions (last appearance – 1991)
 Washington Redskins (last appearance – 1991)
 Longest drought without an NFC Championship: 51 years***; Detroit Lions
 Largest comeback: 17 points (trailed 17–0; won 28–24), San Francisco 49ers, 2012
 Overtime games:
 1998 Atlanta Falcons 30 Minnesota Vikings 27
 2007 New York Giants 23 Green Bay Packers 20
 2009 New Orleans Saints 31 Minnesota Vikings 28
 2011 New York Giants 20 San Francisco 49ers 17
 2014 Seattle Seahawks 28 Green Bay Packers 22
 2018 Los Angeles Rams 26 New Orleans Saints 23

Notes:
 *Tied for Conference Championship record

TV ratings
2006: 35.233 million viewers
2010: 57.9 million viewers
2011: 51.9 million viewers
2012: 57.6 million viewers
2013: 42.0 million viewers
2014: 55.91 million viewers
2015: 49.8 million viewers

Footnotes

References
Time Almanac 2004

 
Recurring sporting events established in 1971